Lord Arthur John Henry Somerset (12 February 1780 – 18 April 1816), English politician, was the sixth son of Henry Somerset, 5th Duke of Beaufort.

Early years 
He was educated at Oriel College, Oxford, taking a BA in 1799 and an MA in 1803. Later that year he was commissioned as captain (24 June) and then major in the Monmouth and Brecon Militia, commanded by his elder brother the 6th Duke. Somerset was then commissioned as a lieutenant in the 7th Foot of the Regular Army on 19 May 1804.

Political career 
He was defeated at Gloucester in August 1805, but in November, was returned as Member of Parliament for Monmouthshire and was appointed a deputy lieutenant of Monmouthshire and Breconshire in December. On 26 June 1806, he was made a captain in the 4th West India Regiment and on 2 October exchanged into the 91st Foot.

Family 
Lord Arthur married his first cousin, Hon. Elizabeth Boscawen (bef. 1793 – 2 March 1872), daughter of George Boscawen, 3rd Viscount Falmouth, on 23 June 1808. They had three children:
 Rev. George Somerset (30 March 1809 – 12 October 1882), married Philida Elizabeth Call, daughter of Sir William Call, 2nd Baronet on 9 September 1835 and had issue.
Elizabeth Anne Somerset (2 August 1810 – 12 April 1835)
 Arthur Edward Somerset (28 August 1813 – 9 September 1853), married his first cousin, Hon. Frances Boscawen, daughter of Rev. Hon. John Evelyn Boscawen, and had issue.

Death 
Somerset moved into the 19th Light Dragoons on 12 September 1811, serving until his death in Lisbon in 1816.

Ancestry

References 

1780 births
1816 deaths
19th Light Dragoons officers
93rd Regiment of Foot officers
Alumni of Oriel College, Oxford
British Militia officers
Deputy Lieutenants of Brecknockshire
Deputy Lieutenants of Monmouthshire
Arthur Somerset
Members of the Parliament of the United Kingdom for Welsh constituencies
Brecknockshire Militia officers
Royal Fusiliers officers
UK MPs 1802–1806
UK MPs 1806–1807
UK MPs 1807–1812
UK MPs 1812–1818
West India Regiment officers
Younger sons of dukes